Tehaolei is an inhabited island of the Sikaiana atoll in the Malaita Province, Solomon Islands in the South Pacific.

Geography
Tehaolei is one of four islands of Sikaiana, a remote tropical coral atoll. Tehaolei lies in the north-western end of the atoll. The other islands of the atoll are Sikaiana, (east), Matuiloto (west), and Matuavi (south).

References

Islands of the Solomon Islands